Soans is a surname. Notable people with the surname include: 

Anton Lembit Soans (1885–1966), Estonian architect and urban planner
Johannes Soans (1867–1941), Estonian politician
Robin Soans (born 1946), British actor and playwright